Dalzellia is a genus of flowering plants belonging to the family Podostemaceae.

Its native range is Indo-China.

Its genus name is in honour of Nicol Alexander Dalzell (1817–1878), a Scottish botanist. It was named in Icon. Pl. Ind. Orient. Vol.5 on page 34 in 1852.

Known species
According Kew Gardens;

Dalzellia angustissima 
Dalzellia attapeuensis 
Dalzellia ceylanica 
Dalzellia gracilis 
Dalzellia kailarsenii 
Dalzellia microphylla 
Dalzellia pseudoangustissima 
Dalzellia ranongensis 
Dalzellia sessilis 
Dalzellia sparsa 
Dalzellia ubonensis

References

Podostemaceae
Malpighiales genera
Taxa named by Robert Wight
Taxa described in 1852